The South Dakota State Innovation Campus in Brookings, South Dakota was founded in 2006 and is the first research park located in South Dakota. The Innovation Campus aims to foster collaboration and partnerships between South Dakota State University, business, industry and government.

The first building at the Innovation Campus, the Innovation Center, is a  multi-tenant/incubator building. A second building, The Seed Technology Laboratory, will be completed in July 2010.

References

External links
 Official website

South Dakota State University
Science parks in the United States
Buildings and structures in Brookings, South Dakota